This is a glossary of poetry.

This is a glossary of poetry terms.

Basic composition

 Accent
 Vedic accent
 Cadence: the patterning of rhythm in poetry, or natural speech, without a distinct meter.
 Line: a unit into which a poem is divided.
 Line break: the termination of the line of a poem and the beginning of a new line.
 Metre (or meter): the basic rhythmic structure of a verse or lines in verse. Metres are influenced by syllables and their 'weight'.
 Metrical foot (aka poetic foot): the basic repeating rhythmic unit that forms part of a line of verse in most Indo-European traditions of poetry.
 Arsis and thesis 
 Prosody: the principles of metrical structure in poetry.
 Syllable weight and stress: weight refers to the duration of a syllable, which can be defined by the length of a vowel; whereas stress refers to a syllable uttered in a higher pitch—or with greater emphasis—than others.
 Stressed or long syllable (Ancient Greek: longum;): a heavy syllable
 Unstressed or short syllable (Ancient Greek: brevis;): a light syllable
 Stanza: a group of lines forming the basic recurring metrical unit in a poem. (cf. verse in music.)
 Verse: formally, a single metrical line. (Not to be confused with musical verse.)
 Gāthā
 Verse paragraph: a group of verse lines that make up a single rhetorical unit

Other parts 

 Anceps: a position in a metrical pattern that can be filled by either a long or a short syllable.

 Caesura: a stop or pause in a metrical line, typically marked by punctuation.
 Canto: a long subsection of a long narrative poem such as an epic.
 End rhyme (aka tail rhyme): a rhyme occurring in the terminating word or syllable of one line in a poem with that of another line, as opposed to internal rhyme.
 End-stopping line
 Enjambment: incomplete syntax at the end of a line; the meaning runs over from one poetic line to the next, without terminal punctuation.
 Epigraph: a quotation from another literary work that is placed under the title at the beginning of a poem or section of a poem.
 Hemistich: a half of a line of verse.
 Internal rhyme: a rhyme that occurs within a single line of verse, or between internal phrases across multiple lines.
 Off-centered rhyme: a rhyme that occurs in an unexpected place in a given line.
 Refrain: repeated lines in a poem.
 Strophe: the first section of a choral ode

Metrical feet 
A metrical foot (aka poetic foot) is the basic repeating rhythmic unit that forms part of a line of verse in most Indo-European traditions of poetry.
Monosyllable 
Disyllable: metrical foot consisting of 2 syllables.
Iamb (aka iambus): short-long 
 Trochee (aka choreus or choree): long-short
 Spondee: long-long
 Pyrrhic (aka dibrach): short-short
 Trisyllable: metrical foot consisting of 3 syllables.
Dactyl: long-short-short 
 Anapaest (aka antidactylus): short-short-long. (Example: “The Destruction of Sennacherib” by Lord Byron.)
 Amphibrach: short-long-short
 Cretic (aka amphimacer): long-short-long. (Example: modern-day uses can typically be found in expressions like "In a while, crocodile;" as well as in slogans and advertising.) 
Molossus: long-long-long
 Tribrach: short-short-short
Bacchius: short-long-long
Antibacchius: long-long-short
Tetrasyllable: metrical foot consisting of 4 syllables.
 Tetrabrach (aka proceleusmatic): short-short-short-short
 Dispondee: long-long-long-long
Paeon: a metrical foot of 1 long syllable and 3 short syllables in any order.
Primus paeon: long-short-short-short
Secundus paeon: short-long-short-short
Tertius paeon: short-short-long-short
Quartus paeon: short-short-short-long
Epitrite: a metrical foot consisting of 3 long syllables and 1 short syllable.
First epitrite: short-long-long-long
 Second epitrite: long-short-long-long
 Third epitrite: long-long-short-long
 Fourth epitrite: long-long-long-short
Ionic: a metrical foot consisting of 2 short and 2 long syllables
Minor ionic (aka double iamb): short-short-long-long
Major ionic: long-long-short-short
Diamb: short-long-short-long (i.e., two iambs)
Ditrochee: long-short-long-short (i.e., two trochees)
Antispast: short-long-long-short
Choriamb: long-short-short-long (i.e., a trochee/choree alternating with an iamb)
Hexasyllable: metrical foot consisting of 6 syllables.
Double dactyl
Octosyllable: metrical foot consisting of 8 syllables.
Decasyllable: metrical foot consisting of 10 syllables.
Hendecasyllable: metrical foot consisting of 11 syllables.
Dodecasyllable: metrical foot consisting of 12 syllables.

Forms

Verse meters 
In a poetic composition, a verse is formally a single metrical line.

 Monometer: a line of verse with just 1 metrical foot.
 Dimeter: a line of verse with 2 metrical feet.
 Trimeter: a line of verse with 3 metrical feet.
 Tetrameter: a line of verse with 4 metrical feet.
 Hexameter: a line of verse with 6 metrical feet.
 Heptameter: a line of verse with 7 metrical feet.
 Octameter: a line of verse with 8 metrical feet.
 Dactylic meter: any meter based on the dactyl as its primary rhythmic unit.
 Dactylic tetrameter
 Dactylic pentameter
 Dactylic hexameter
 Golden line
 Iambic meter: any meter based on the iamb as its primary rhythmic unit.
 Alexandrine (iambic hexameter): a 12-syllable iambic line adapted from French heroic verse. Example: the last line of each stanza in “The Convergence of the Twain” by Thomas Hardy.
 Czech alexandrine
 French alexandrine
 Polish alexandrine
 Fourteener (iambic heptameter): line consisting of 7 iambic feet (14 syllables)
 Galliambic verse
 Iambic pentameter: line consisting of 5 iambic feet (10 syllables)
 Iambic tetrameter: line consisting of 4 iambic feet (8 syllables)
 Trochaic meter: any meter based on the trochee as its primary rhythmic unit.
 Trochaic tetrameter
 Trochaic octameter
 Trochaic septenarius
 Arabic poetic meters:
 Basīṭ
 Hazaj
 Kāmil
 Mutaqārib
 Madīd
 Rajaz
 Tawīl
 Wāfir
 Anapestic tetrameter (aka reverse dactyl): a poetic meter that has 4 anapestic metres per line.
 Common metre: a quatrain that rhymes "abab" and alternates 4-stress and 3-stress iambic lines. This is the meter used in hymns and ballads.
 Indian poetic meters:
 Chhand
 Kannada meter
 Mandakranta
 Mātrika
 Ovi
 Triveni
 Sanskrit meter
 Tamil meter
 Vedic meter
 Triṣṭubh: a Vedic meter of 44 syllables, or any hymn composed in this meter
 Long metre (aka long measure): a poetic metre consisting of quatrains (4-line stanzas) in iambic tetrameter with the rhyme pattern "abab".
 Persian metres
 Quantitative meter: the dominant metrical system in which the rhythm depends on the length of time it takes to utter a line rather than on the number of stresses.
 Traditional Welsh

Types of verse 

 Accentual verse
 Accentual-syllabic verse
 Acatalexis
 Adonic
 Aeolic
 Glyconic: most basic form of aeolic verse.
 Alcmanian
 Archilochian
 Asclepiad

 Choliamb
 Dochmiac
 Doggerel: a bad verse, traditionally characterized by clichés, clumsiness, and irregular meter.
 Free verse and vers libre: an open form of poetry that does not use consistent of meter patterns, rhyme, or any musical pattern, therefore tending to follow the rhythm of natural speech.
 Knittelvers
 Heroic verse
 Riding rhyme: an early form of heroic verse derived from the rhythm of the poetry in parts of The Canterbury Tales depicting the pilgrims as they rode along.
 Leonine verse
 McWhirtle
 Neo-Miltonic syllabics
 Political verse (aka decapentasyllabic verse): iambic verse of 15 syllables.
 Saturnian
 Anuṣṭubh: a quatrain with each line (called a pāda, or 'foot') having 8 syllables.
 Shloka
 Triadic-line

Verse forms 
(A capital letter in any rhyme schemes below indicates a line that is repeated verbatim.)
Blank verse: non-rhyming iambic pentameter (10-syllable line). It is the predominant rhythm of traditional English dramatic and epic poetry, as it is considered the closest to English speech patterns. Examples: "Paradise Lost" by John Milton and “Sunday Morning” by Wallace Stevens.
Chant royal: five stanzas of "ababccddedE" followed by either "ddedE" or "ccddedE."
'a Gra' Reformata': ten stanzas of ABA CD ABA CD ABA CD ABA CD ABA CD ABAC. Following the rhyme scheme of the Villanelle, but with 5 extra couplets just after each tercet.
 Cinquain: "ababb".
 Clerihew: "aabb".
 Enclosed rhyme (aka enclosing rhyme): "abba".
 Ghazal: "aa ba ca da ..."
Kural: Tamil verse form
Limerick: "aabba".
 Monorhyme: an identical rhyme on every line, common in Latin and Arabic. ("aaaaa...")
 Rondelet: "AbAabbA".
 Rubaiyat: "aaba".
 Sapphics
 Seguidilla: Spanish-origin poem with seven syllable-counted lines, rhyming the second & fourth, and the fifth & seventh lines ("abcbded") 
 Petrarchan sonnet: "abba abba cde cde" or "abba abba cdc cdc".
Sestina: a complex French verse form, usually unrhymed, consisting of 6 stanzas of 6 lines each and a 3-line envoi. 
Shadorma: an allegedly Spanish six-line stanza, syllable-count restricted form, 3/5/3/3/7/5
 Shakespearean sonnet: "abab cdcd efef gg".
 Simple 4-line: "abcb"
 Spenserian sonnet: "abab bcbc cdcd ee".
 Onegin stanzas: "" with lowercase letters representing assonant rhymes and the uppercase representing end-rhymes.
 Sprung rhythm: a poetic rhythm designed to imitate the rhythm of natural speech.
Tanaga: traditional Tagalog tanaga is "aaaa"
 Terza rima: "aba bcb cdc ...", ending on "yzy z" or "yzy zz/"

Types of rhyming 
A rhyme is the repetition of syllables, typically found at the end of a verse line.

 Assonance (aka vowel rhyme): the repetition of vowel sounds without repeating consonants.
 Broken rhyme: a type of enjambment producing a rhyme by dividing a word at the line break of a poem to make a rhyme with the end word of another line
 Catalectic
 Acephalous line
 Chiasmus: repetition of any group of verse elements (including rhyme and grammatical structure) in reverse order.
 Consonance: the repetition of identical or similar consonants in neighboring words whose vowel sounds are different
 Alliteration: the repetition of initial stressed, consonant sounds in a series of words within a phrase or verse line.
 Cross rhyme
 Holorime: identical pronunciation of different lines; in other words, when two entire lines have the same sound
 Imperfect rhyme (aka half or near rhyme)
 Monorhyme
 Pararhyme
 Perfect rhyme (aka full or exact rhyme)
 Syllabic

Types of stanza 
A stanza is a group of lines forming the basic recurring metrical unit in a poem. (cf. verse in music.)

 Alcaic: a 4-line stanza invented by the Classical Greek poet Alcaeus that uses a specific syllabic count per line and a predominantly dactylic meter.
 Ballad
 Biolet
 Burns
 Chaubola
 Cinquain
 Couplet: two successive rhyming lines ("aa"), usually of the same length (usually re-occurring as "aa bb cc dd ...").
 Doha
 Heroic couplet: written in iambic pentameter.
 Poulter's measure: couplets in which a 12-syllable iambic line rhymes with a 14-syllable iambic line.
 Envoi (or envoy): the brief stanza that ends French poetic forms such as the ballade or sestina. 
 Ghazal
 Octave: an 8-line stanza or poem.
 Ottava rima: an Italian stanza of eight 11-syllable lines, with a rhyme scheme of "abababcc."
 Quatorzain
 Quatrain: a 4-line poem or stanza
 Quintain
 Rhyme royal: a stanza of seven 10-syllable lines, rhyming "ababbcc."
 Sapphic
 Sestain
 Sestet: a 6-line stanza
 Onegin stanza
 Spenserian: consists of 9 lines in total—8 iambic-pentameter lines and a final alexandrine—with a rhyme scheme of "ababbcbcc."
 Tercet (or triplet): a unit of three lines, rhymed ("aaa") or unrhymed, often repeating like the couplet.
 Triolet: an 8-line stanza with only two rhymes, repeating the 1st line as the 4th and 7th lines, and the 2nd line as the 8th ("ABaAabAB").
 Terza rima: an Italian stanzaic form consisting of tercets with interwoven rhymes ("aba bcb ded efe...").

Genres

Genres by structure 

Fixed form (French: forme fixe): the three 14th- and 15th-century French poetic forms: 
Ballade: three 8-line stanzas ("ababbcbC") and a 4-line envoi ("bcbC"). The last line of the first stanza is repeated verbatim at the end of subsequent stanzas and the envoi. Example: Algernon Charles Swinburne’s translation “Ballade des Pendus” by François Villon.
Rondeau: a mainly octosyllabic poem consisting of between 10 and 15 lines and 3 stanzas. It has only 2 rhymes, with the opening words used twice as an un-rhyming refrain at the end of the 2nd and 3rd stanzas.
Virelai
 Found poem: a prose text or texts reshaped by a poet into quasi-metrical lines.
 Haiku: a type of short poem, originally from Japan, consisting of three lines in a 5, 7, 5 syllable pattern.
 English-language haiku: an unrhymed tercet poem in the haiku style.
 Lekythion: a sequence of seven alternating long and short syllables at the end of a verse.
 Landay: a form of Afghani folk poetry that is composed as a couplet of 22 syllables.
 Mukhammas
 Pantoum: a Malaysian verse form adapted by French poets comprising a series of quatrains, with the 2nd and 4th lines of each quatrain repeated as the 1st and 3rd lines of the next. The 2nd and 4th lines of the final stanza repeat the 1st and 3rd lines of the first stanza.
 Pastiche
 Prose: a prose composition that is not broken into verse lines, instead expressing other traits such as symbols, metaphors, and figures of speech.
 Rondel (or roundel): a poem of 11 to 14 lines consisting of 2 rhymes and the repetition of the first 2 lines in the middle of the poem and at its end.
 Sonnet: a poem of 14 lines using any of a number of formal rhyme schemes; in English, they typically have 10 syllables per line.
 Caudate sonnet
 Crown of sonnets (aka sonnet redoublé)
 Curtal sonnet
 Petrarchan (or Italian): traditionally follows the rhyme scheme "abba, abba, cdecde"; a common variation of the end is "cdcdcd", especially within the final 6 lines
 Shakespearean (or English): follows the rhyme scheme abab, cdcd, efef, gg, introducing a third quatrain (grouping of four lines), a final couplet, and a greater amount of variety with regard to rhyme than is usually found in its Italian predecessors. By convention, sonnets in English typically use iambic pentameter, while in the Romance languages, the hendecasyllable and Alexandrine are the most widely used meters.
 Sonnet sequence
 Spenserian sonnet
 Sijo
 Stichic: a poem composed of lines of the same approximate meter and length, not broken into stanzas.
 Syllabic: a poem whose meter is determined by the total number of syllables per line, rather than the number of stresses.
 Tanka: a Japanese form of five lines with 5, 7, 5, 7, and 7 syllables—31 in all.
 Villanelle: a French verse form consisting of five 3-line stanzas and a final quatrain, with the first and third lines of the first stanza repeating alternately in the following stanzas.

Genre by form/presentation 

 Abecedarian: a poem in which the first letter of each line or stanza follows sequentially through the alphabet.
 Acrostic: a poem in which the first letter of each line spells out a word, name, or phrase when read vertically. Example: “A Boat beneath a Sunny Sky” by Lewis Carroll.
 Concrete (aka pattern): a written poem or verse whose lines are arranged as a shape/visual image, usually of the topic.
 Slam
 Sound
 Spoken-word
 Verbless poetry: a poem without verbs

Thematic genres 

 Ars Poetica: a poem that explains the 'art of poetry', or a meditation on poetry using the form and techniques of a poem.
 Aubade: a love poem welcoming or lamenting the arrival of the dawn. Example: “The Sun Rising” by John Donne.
 Deep image
 Didactic
 Dramatic monologue
 Epithalamium (aka epithalamion): a nuptial poem in honour of the bride and bridegroom.
 Ecopoetry
 Ekphrasis: a poem that vividly describes a scene or work of art.
 Elliptical
 Epigram
 Folk
 Folk ballad
 Gnomic: a poems laced with proverbs, aphorisms, or maxims.
 Hymn: a poem praising God or the divine (often sung).
 Lament: any poem expressing deep grief, usually at a death or some other loss.
 Dirge
 Elegy: a poem of lament, praise, and consolation, usually formal and sustained, over the death of a particular person. Example: "Elegy Written in a Country Churchyard" by Thomas Gray.
 Light: whimsical poems
 Limerick
 Nonsense
 Double dactyl
 Lyric
 Canzone: a lyric poem originating in medieval Italy and France and usually consisting of hendecasyllabic lines with end-rhyme.
 Epithalamium
 Madrigal: a song or short lyric poem intended for multiple singers.
 Ode: a formal lyric poem that addresses, and typically celebrates, a person, place, thing, or idea. 
 Horatian Ode
 Palinode: an ode that retracts or recants what the poet wrote in a previous poem.
 Pindaric Ode
 Sapphic ode
 Stev: a form of Norwegian folk song consisting of quatrain lyric stanzas.
 Meditative
 Narrative
 Ballad: a popular narrative song passed down orally. In English, it typically follows a form of rhymed ("abcb") quatrains alternating 4-stress and 3-stress lines.
 Folk ballad: unknown origin, recounting tragic, comic, or heroic stories with emphasis on a central dramatic event. Examples: "Barbara Allen" and "John Henry"
 Literary ballad: poems adapting the conventions of folk ballads, beginning in the Renaissance. Examples: “La Belle Dame sans Merci” by John Keats and “Annabel Lee” by Edgar Allan Poe. 
 Epic (or epos): an extended narrative poem, typically expressing heroic themes.
 Mock-epic: a poem that plays with the conventions of the epic to comment on a topic satirically.
 Epyllion: a brief narrative work written in dactylic hexameter, commonly dealing with mythological themes and characterized by vivid description and allusion.
 Romance
 Occasional: a poem written to describe or comment on a particular event.
 Panegyric: a poem of great praise.
 Pastoral
 Eclogue: a pastoral poem usually containing dialogue between shepherds.
 Georgic
 Recusatio: a poem (or part thereof) in which the poet claim that they are supposedly unable or disinclined to write the type of poem that they originally intended to, and instead writes in a different style.

Movements 
 Avant-garde
 Flarf
 Futurist
 Language
 Beat: A movement that arose from San Francisco’s literary counterculture in the 1950s. Its poetry is primarily free verse, often surrealistic, and influenced by the cadences of jazz music.
 Black Mountain: A group of progressives in North Carolina associated with the experimental Black Mountain College in the 1940s and 1950s. Its poetic composition promoted a nontraditional style, following a improvisational, open-form approach, driven by the natural patterns of breath and the spoken word.
 Confessional
 Dada
 Dark Room Collective
 Fireside
 Fugitives
 Georgian
 Harlem Renaissance
 Imagism
 Metaphysical
 Négritude
 New American
 New Critic
 New Formalist
 New Historicist
 New York School
 Objectivist
 Oulipo
 Pre-Raphaelite
 Romantic
 Symbolist

Other poetic devices 

 Allusion: a brief, intentional reference to a historical, mythic, or literary person, place, event, or movement; in other words, a figure of speech using indirect reference."
 Anacrusis: brief introduction.
 Anaphora: the repetition of a word or words at the beginning of successive phrases, clauses, or lines to give emphasis.
 Apostrophe: an address to a dead or absent person, or personification as if that person were present. Example: "O Captain! My Captain!" by Walt Whitman. 
 Blason: describes the physical attributes of a subject, usually female.
 Circumlocution: a roundabout wording. Example: In "Kubla Khan" by Samuel Taylor Coleridge—“twice five miles of fertile ground” (i.e., 10 miles).
 Epistrophe (aka epiphora): the repetition of a word or expression at the end of successive phrases or verses.
 Epizeuxis: the immediate repetition of a word or phrase for emphasis.
 Metaphor: a rhetorical figure of speech marked by implicit comparison, rather than direct or explicit comparison like in a simile. In a metaphor, the tenor is the subject to which attributes are ascribed (i.e., the target); the vehicle is the subject from which the attributes are derived/borrowed (i.e., the source); and ground is the shared properties between the two.
 Conceit: a typically unconventional, logically complex, or surprising metaphor whose appeal is more intellectual than emotional.
 Extended metaphor (aka sustained metaphor): the exploitation of a single metaphor or analogy at length through multiple linked tenors and vehicles throughout a poem.
 Allegory: an extended metaphor in which the characters, places, and objects in a narrative carry figurative meaning. Often, the meaning of an allegory is religious, moral, or historical in nature. Example: "The Faerie Queene" by Edmund Spenser.
 Periphrasis: the usage of multiple separate words to carry the meaning of prefixes, suffixes or verbs.
 Objective correlative
 Simile: a figure of speech that directly/explicitly compares two things.
 Homeric simile (aka epic simile)
 Syzygy: the combination of 2 metrical feet into a single unit, similar to an elision.

Theory 

 Descriptive poetics
 Historical poetics
 Negative capability
 Pathetic fallacy
 Poetic diction
 Poetic license
 Porson's Law
 Resolution: the phenomenon of replacing a long syllable with 2 short syllables.
 Robert Bridges's theory of elision
 Scansion
 Sievers's theory of Anglo-Saxon meter
 Theopoetics
 Weak position

See also
 Poetry
Poet
List of basic poetry topics
 Literature
List of literary terms

References

Further reading
M. H. Abrams. A Glossary of Literary Terms. Thomson-Wadsworth, 2005. .
Chris Baldick. The Concise Oxford Dictionary of Literary Terms. Oxford Univ. Press, 2001. .
—— The Concise Dictionary of Literary Terms. Oxford Univ. Press, 2004. .
Edwin Barton & G. A. Hudson. Contemporary Guide To Literary Terms. Houghton-Mifflin, 2003. .
Mark Bauerlein. Literary Criticism: An Autopsy. Univ. of Pennsylvania Press, 1997. .
Karl Beckson & Arthur Ganz. Literary Terms: A Dictionary. Farrar, Straus and Giroux, 1989. .
Peter Childs. The Routledge Dictionary of Literary Terms. Routledge, 2005. .
J. A. Cuddon. The Penguin Dictionary of Literary Terms and Literary Theory. Penguin Books, 2000.  .
Dana Gioia. The Longman Dictionary of Literary Terms: Vocabulary for the Informed Reader. Longman, 2005. .
Sharon Hamilton. Essential Literary Terms: A Brief Norton Guide with Exercises. W. W. Norton, 2006. .
William Harmon. A Handbook to Literature. Prentice Hall, 2005. .
X. J. Kennedy, et al. Handbook of Literary Terms: Literature, Language, Theory. Longman, 2004. .
V. B. Leitch. The Norton Anthology of Theory and Criticism. W. W. Norton, 2001. .
John Lennard, The Poetry Handbook. Oxford Univ. Press, 1996, 2005. .
Frank Lentricchia & Thomas McLaughlin. Critical Terms for Literary Study. Univ. of Chicago Press, 1995. .
David Mikics. A New Handbook of Literary Terms. Yale Univ. Press, 2007. .
Ross Murfin & S. M. Ray. The Bedford Glossary of Critical and Literary Terms. Bedford/St. Martin's, 2006. .
John Peck & Martin Coyle. Literary Terms and Criticism. Palgrave Macmillan, 2002. .
Edward Quinn. A Dictionary of Literary And Thematic Terms. Checkmark Books, 2006. .
Lewis Turco. The Book of Literary Terms: The Genres of Fiction, Drama, Nonfiction, Literary Criticism, and Scholarship. Univ. Press of New England, 1999. .

Poetry
Literary criticism

 Glossary
Wikipedia glossaries using unordered lists